Elisabeth of Anhalt (7 September 1857 – 20 July 1933) was the Grand Duchess of Mecklenburg-Strelitz from 1904 to 1914 as the spouse of Adolf Friedrich V, Grand Duke of Mecklenburg-Strelitz.

Family
She was born Princess Elisabeth Marie Frederica Amelia Agnes in Wörlitz, the third child of Friedrich I, Duke of Anhalt and Princess Antoinette of Saxe-Altenburg. Her nickname in the family was "Elly".

Marriage
On 17 April 1877 Elisabeth became the Hereditary Grand Duchess of Mecklenburg-Strelitz when she married the then Hereditary Grand Duke, Adolf Friedrich in Dessau.

Elisabeth and Adolf Friedrich had four children:

Duchess Marie of Mecklenburg-Strelitz (1878–1948) married 22 June 1899 and divorced 31 December 1908 Count George Jametel (1859–1944), married secondly on 11 August 1914 Prince Julius Ernst of Lippe (1873–1952).
Duchess Jutta of Mecklenburg-Strelitz (1880–1946) married 27 July 1899 Danilo, Crown Prince of Montenegro.
Adolphus Frederick VI, Grand Duke of Mecklenburg-Strelitz (1882–1918).
Duke Karl Borwin of Mecklenburg-Strelitz (Karl Borwin Christian Alexander Arthur, Herzog von Mecklenburg-Strelitz; 10 October 1888 – 24 August 1908); killed in a duel with his brother-in-law Count George Jametel, defending his sister's honor.

Later life
Following the death of her father-in-law on the 30 May 1904, she became The Grand Duchess of Mecklenburg-Strelitz following her husband's ascension to the throne. After her husband's death in 1914, she was titled Grand Duchess Elisabeth of Mecklenburg-Strelitz, since her mother-in-law was still alive. Only after her death in 1916 that Elisabeth officially became ''The Dowager Grand Duchess of Mecklenburg-Strelitz. 

After the death of her eldest son, Grand Duke Adolf Frederick, in 1918 she inherited the 'hunting castle' of Prilvitz. She died in Neustrelitz on 20 July 1933. After her death, the castle of Prilvitz was inherited by her surviving children, which were her two adult daughters. Only Marie, eldest of these, has descendants who are members of the House of Lippe.

Ancestry

References

External links
Elisabeth, Grand Duchess of Mecklenburg-Strelitz

1857 births
1933 deaths
House of Ascania
House of Mecklenburg-Strelitz
Duchesses of Mecklenburg-Strelitz
People from Wörlitz
Hereditary Grand Duchesses of Mecklenburg-Strelitz
Grand Duchesses of Mecklenburg-Strelitz
German people of French descent
Daughters of monarchs